The phonology of the Massachusett language was re-introduced to the Mashpee, Aquinnah, Herring Pond and Assonet tribes that participate in the Wôpanâak Language Reclamation Project, co-founded by Jessie Little Doe Baird in 1993.  The phonology is based regular sound changes that took place in the development of Proto-Eastern Algonquian from Proto-Algonquian, as well as cues in the colonial orthography regarding pronunciation, as the writing system was based on English pronunciation and spelling conventions in use at the time, keeping in mind differences in late seventeenth century English versus today.  Other resources included information from extant Algonquian languages with native speakers.

The Massachusett language is an eastern branch Algonquian language within the Algic language family.  It was historically spoken by the Massachusett people of Greater Boston, the Pawtucket of southernmost Maine, coastal New Hampshire and the lower Merrimack River watershed, the Wampanoag of southeastern Massachusetts but specifically Cape Cod and the Islands and portions of Rhode Island, the Nauset (possibly a Wampanoag sub-group) of the outer Cape and the Coweset of north-western Rhode Island, and likely spread as a common second language to many Nipmuc and Pennacook speaking groups.  In a simplified Pidgin form, it was a common medium of intertribal communication across most of New England and Long Island.

The historical phonology of the language is hampered by the dormancy of the language with the death of the last speakers at the end of the nineteenth century as well as dialect leveling.  Since the Bible and most of the missionary translations were based on the dialect of the Massachusett people, specifically its Natick variety, that form gained prestige.  The use of Natick as a training center for Indian missionaries and teachers, who were literate and often drawn from Natick's local families, helped spread the prestige of the particular variety, so that most dialectal differences were quickly lost.  Dialects certainly existed given the diversity of peoples that used it and its broad distribution.

Vowels

PA *wapyawi > PEA *wa·pe·yɘw > PSNEA *wąpa·yɘw > Massachusett wompi (wôpay) , ('it is white.')

Vocalic allophones
The exact values and ranges for allophonic variation of the vowels is unknown, given the death of the last native speakers a century and a quarter in the past, but given that the colonial orthography was based on English values as spoken in the seventeenth century, some clues are provided. Given that open front unrounded  before  was often syncopated, it is likely this allophone approached .

A similar process also occurs in Abenakian languages.

The long vowel  is written in a myriad of ways, which may just be the difficulty in rendering the vowel according to English spelling rules as used in the colonial orthography.

Before , colonial writers used , possibly indicating an allophone  before . The colonial orthography assigns vowels with a circumflex to write them, but this was not done consistently.
  
For example, 'snake' is askꝏk (ask8k)  and descends from Proto-Algonquian *aθko·ka and Proto-Eastern Algonquian *axko·k.

Consonants

Massachusett has thirteen consonant phonemes, not including possible allophones. In addition, Massachusett consonants probably lacked distinctions based on aspiration for these consonants. In English, the equivalent stop consonants are aspirated in stressed and in final positions, but not in consonant clusters after  (for example, English spin is pronounced  while pin is pronounced ).

Eliot and the other colonial missionaries often switched between the unvoiced-voiced pairs, and it is possible that the consonants themselves had allophones dependent on word position and dialect.

As a result of borrowings, English-language religious, technical, agricultural, legal, societal, cultural, and governmental terminology was adopted by the Indians. However, it is likely that only bilingual speakers or those exposed to English speakers pronounced these words more akin to their English values, whereas monolingual Massachusett speakers and those further from English contact would have likely used native approximantions. For example, colonial-era documents include both preserved Frenchmenog (possibly ) vs. nativized panachmanog (possibly ). However, final  goes unnoticed as English in New England developed non-rhotically.

Although the revived dialect of the Wampanoag continues to use some loan words from English (such as pâyum-,  from English pay), most borrowings are eschewed for native equivalents, neologisms coined from known Massachusett radicals and adoption of terms from cognate, extant Algonquian languages since the new speakers of the language are all bilingual or more proficient in English. For example, the colonial-era Indians adopted the English calendrical system, and adopted all the terms for units of time and names for the days and months. Thus, 'Thursday' and as well as its alternate Early Modern English form Yurſday existed along the lesser-used Massachusett coinage nappanatashikquinishonk (nôpanatahshuquneehshôk) , which can be translated as 'that which goes five days long' (after the [original] Sabbath).  However, nappanatashikquinishonk is created from Massachusett radicals by the Indians, even if it referred to a Western cultural introduction.

Phonotactics
For example, annum (anum, 'dog,') but annúmmwag (anumwak, 'dogs')  Also, additional morphemes attached to the root word often begin with consonants themselves, thus increasing their likelihood at these junctures.

The Massachusett word, wussuhquohhonk (wusuhqahôk , 'writing' or 'book') was altered to wussukwhonk (*wusuhqhôk ), yielding a cluster .

Prosody
Stress in the language is unknown, but Massachusett likely had a stress system similar to extant languages, such as Ojibwe, Algonquin, Mi'kmaq, Munsee and Unami. In Ojibwe, the rule is as follows: A metrical foot consists of two syllables, ideally with the stress on the second syllable.  All long vowels are stressed, and when they occur in the weaker syllable of a metrical foot, the syllable that contains them is counted as its own foot and counting begins on the next syllable pair, and the last syllable is always stressed.

In M'ikmaq, Unami and Munsee, languages that are more closely related to Massachusett, the rules are a little more complex. In these languages, metrical feet consist of two syllables or morae, forming either strong right-foot iambs or strong left-foot trochees. Primary stress generally falls on either the rightmost (iambic) or leftmost (trochaic) syllables, but there are numerous exceptions. Unlike the Ojibwe system, these Eastern Algonquian languages allow for word-final unstressed syllables. Long vowels tend to be stressed, but may be shortened when long vowels fall in the weaker position. Long vowels and short syllables in the strong part of the foot receive secondary stress.  Stressed words, especially the primary stress, are pronounced louder and at a higher pitch, with secondary stress the effects less so.  Because Massachusett, generally, does not undergo vowel syncope, weak vowels can receive secondary stress and entire words can consist of weak, short vowel syllables as in Mi'kmaq and Unami.

 weyaus (weeyâws) , ('flesh')
 sépꝏ (seepuw) , ('river')
 sábahég (sâpaheek) , ('soup')
 wampanoag (wôpanâak) , ('Wampanoag')
 keen (keen) , ('you')
 askꝏk (ask8k) , ('snake')
 mishoon (muhsh8n) , ('canoe')
 kuttuntantamummin (kutunantamumun) , ('we (inclusive) think')
 peyaumꝏash (peeyômuwash) , ('they come' or 'they are coming')
 ohkeomꝏs (âhkeeôm8s) , ('bee')
 waskétop (waskeetôp) , ('man')
 mockus (mahkus) , ('shoe')

Phonological processes

Vowel affection

 nepitt (neeput) , ('my tooth') and nepitteash (neeputeash) , ('my teeth') from PA *ni·piči (singular)  via PEA *nīpītar (plural).
 sekeneam or sekunyam (seekuneam)  ('she/he refuses to') from PEA *sīnkīnam.
 wuskannemunneash (wuskaneemuneash)  ('seeds') from PA *[weškin]imi·ni (singular) via PEA *wəθkanīmīnar (plural).
 ogquenneoquss (aquneôqus)  ('to resemble').

Palatization of /k/
Unique to Southern New England Algonquian, the same processes that trigger vowel affection also bring about palatization.

 wetu (weetyuw),  ('home') from PA *wi·kiwa·ʔmi, but week[u] (weekuw) , ('it is her/his home').
 sachem (sôtyum)  ('chief') from PA *sa·kima·wa but sonksquaw (sôkusqâ) , ('female chief').
 keteau (keetyâw)  ('he/she recovers') from PEA *kīkēw.
 pittu (putyuw) , ('pitch' or 'gum') from PEA *pəkəw.
 -uhpeteog[un] (-uhpeetyâk[an]) , ('rib') from PA *spike·kani.

Historical phonology

The most ancient reconstructed ancestor of the Massachusett language is Proto-Algic, believed to have been spoken circa 5000 BC in what is now the Northwest Plateau region, such as the inland regions of the Pacific Northwest along the Columbia River separated from the coast by rugged mountains.  Movements of people and competition for resources, shifts to other languages that developed or arrived in the region pushed the Algic languages out of their original homeland.  The only known non-Algonquian Algic languages are Yurokan and Wiyotan, known only from the current languages Yurok and Wiyot, which despite sharing cultural similarities and inhabiting adjacent areas of the northernmost coastal area of California, their languages are relics of a historically more widespread group of languages which diverged in the very distant past.

From an unknown Algic ancestor, Proto-Algonquian emerged sometime around 1000 BC, posited to have been spoken anywhere from the foothills of the Rocky Mountains of Montana or an area just west of the Great Lakes.  The Algonquian languages spread, covering southern Canada and the northern half of the United States from the Rocky Mountains to the Atlantic Ocean.  Around 1000 AD, Proto-Eastern Algonquian emerged, probably somewhere in southern Ontario about the Great Lakes region, and spread from the Maritimes to the Carolinas and separated by speakers of Iroquoian languages.  The Eastern languages, which are the only genetic grouping to have emerged from Algonquian, can be further differentiated.

Proto-Eastern Algonquian had a daughter language, Proto-Southern New England Algonquian, which is the ancestor of all the languages of southern New England and most of Long Island.  This includes related languages such as Nipmuc, Mohegan-Pequot, Niantic, Narragansett and Quiripi-Naugatuck.  The timeline for the development of PSNEA is unclear, but it might be linked to the local adoption of corn, beans and squash agriculture slowly introduced from the south.  When Massachusett emerged as a spoken language is unclear, but by the 1400s, cultural practices and peoples would probably be recognizable to the Pilgrims and Puritans that encountered their descendants two centuries later.

Consonant development
The most striking feature in the development of Proto-Eastern Algonquian was the collapse of PA *θ and *l into PEA *r. As a result, reconstructed PA *aθemwa ('dog') and **e·likwa ('ant') become PEA *arəm and *e·ri·kw, respectively. Note that PSNEA inherited *arəm unaltered, but either reduplication or an unknown prefix, PA *e·ri·kw yields Massachusett anuneks or annuncks (possibly * with diminutive suffix) instead of expected PSNEA *a·nəkw.

In consonant clusters, however, PA *θ and *l behave very differently. Proto-Algonquian *Cθ generally yields *Cx, save PA *nθ which develops into PEA *hr.  In clusters of PA *θC, most merge into PEA *sC with the exception of PA *θp which is realized as PEA *šp.  Very few PA clusters of *Cl are permitted.  The development of PA *ˀl to PEA *hr is expected, but PA *hl falls into PEA *hx and PA *nl is even more erratic.  Under normal development, *nl would yield PEA *hr, but it morphs into *h in transitive inanimate singular imperatives.  Furthermore, PA *ˀl, *nl and *nθ > PEA *hr, *PA *hl, *hθ and *ˀθ > PEA *hx.

Other general mergers include the collapse of PA *hC and *ˀC into PEA *hC.  For example, PA *ht and *ˀt > PEA **ht and PA *ht, PA *hp and *ˀp > PEA **hp and *hč and *ˀč > PEA **hč.   With the exception of *nl and *nθ, all instances of PA *nC are retained in PEA.  Proto-Algonquian *ç develops into *r in PEA even in clusters.  PA *č before *p and *k altered to PEA *š and *s, respectively.  Also, PA *x and *s merge into PEA *s.  Proto-Eastern Algonquian also prefers to drop PA *w and *y after consonants and clusters in PEA, but these are often restored by analogy when there are inflectional endings.  For example, PA *maθkwa > PEA *maxk > PSNEA *mask > Massachusett mosk (masq) , but Massachusett mosgquak (masqash) .

In the development of Proto-Southern New England Algonquian, several notable developments take place, especially in regards to PEA *r.  In PEA, all instances of *r that descend from PA *ç must have been unstable or had a unique treatment in PEA as they all shifted to PSNEA *s, e.g., PA *ç > PEA *r > PSNEA *s, PA *çk > PEA *rk > PSNEA *sk and PA *çp > PEA *rp > PSNEA *sp.  Clusters from PEA with *r also show the same instability.  Whereas PEA *r yields PSNEA *r, in final positions, it becomes PSNEA *š, most noticeable in treatments of inanimate plurals.  For example, PA *meçkw- > PEA *mərkw- > PSNEA *məskw- > Massachusett musqu (mushq-), 'red.'  But also PA *mehθo·θši > PEA *məhxo·r > PSNEA *məhšo·r > Massachusett mishoon (muhsh8n) .

In a similar vein, PEA *hr, *hš and *hx all merge into PSNEA *hš. Even PEA *nš and *šp yield PSNEA *s and *sp, respectively. For example, PA *le·hle- > PEA *re·hxe- > PSNEA *ra·hš > Massachusett náhsh- (nâhsh-)  and PEA *wi·nkwe·hre·w > PSNEA *wi·kwahš > Massachusett wégquosh (weeqahsh) 

A major development is the palatization of PEA *k.  As described in other sections, this causes a shift to PSNEA *ty in restrictive environments.  For example, PA *kakakiwa > PEA *kakakiw > PSNEA *kąkąntyəw > Massachusett kôkontu (kôkôtyuw) , 'crow.'  Furthermore, PEA *sk undergoes palatization to PSNEA *hč.  For example, PA *niswineθke·k > PEA *ni·sinǝxke·k (northern PEA *ni·sinǝške·k and possibly even *ni·sinǝske·k in New England PEA) > PSNEA *ni·sǝnǝhča·k > Massachusett nesnehchag (neesnuhchâk) , 'twenty' (literally 'two [pairs of] hands'). Otherwise, the typical development of PA *θk is PSNEA *sk.

In the development of Massachusett from PSNEA, a few noticeable differences arise. For instance, PSNEA *arəm ('dog') was Massachusett anum, Narragansett ayimp, Nipmuc alum, and Quiripi arum.

The instability of PA *nl is also preserved.

Vowel development

The vowels of Proto-Algonquian were very symmetric, comprising short vowels *a, *e, *i and *o followed by their long counterparts *a·, *e·, *i· and *o·.  These remained relatively intact in some of the Central Algonquian languages, but were radically restructured in most of the Plains Algonquian languages and Eastern Algonquian languages.

Both PA *i and *o are lost and merge into their long counterparts in PEA, e.g., PA *i and *i· > PEA *i· and PA *o and *o· > PEA *o·.  Proto-Algonquian *e alters to PEA *ə but PA *a, *a· and *e· remain unchanged.  This left PEA Algonquian with two short vowels *a and *ə and four long vowels *a·, *e·, *i· and  *o·.

Proto-Southern New England Algonquian kept the PEA vowels *a, *ə and *o· unaltered. Proto-Eastern Algonquian *e· shifted to PSNEA *a·. However, PEA *a· was lost, instead it was altered to the PSNEA nasal vowel *ą.  Although this appears to be diagnostic of the SNEA languages, the intrusive nasal is possibly a feature shared with Algonquian. The PEA long vowel *i· underwent some alteration. When not in the initial syllable of a word, and probably in an unstressed position often shortened to PSNEA *ə, a process that may also trigger vowel affection and  palatization.

However, in the modern orthography,  is only used for what can be traced back to developments from Proto-Algonquian *o·.

Development examples

References

Algic languages
Algonquian languages
Eastern Algonquian languages
Indigenous languages of the North American eastern woodlands
Massachusett language
Languages of the United States
Wampanoag
Native American phonologies